Cryonics – Freeze Me (originally titled Death in the Deep Freeze) is a television documentary programme created by ZigZag Production for Five in 2006 for in their Stranger than Fiction series. The program's main topic is cryonics and mainly features interviews with Alcor Life Extension Foundation staff or Alcor members. The documentary is narrated by Michael Lumsden. Directed by Virginia Quinn .

Interviews with the following people are featured (in order of appearance):

 Tanya Jones, Chief Operating Officer, Alcor
 Michael Riskin, Ph.D., Alcor Board of Directors and Member
 Anita Riskin, Alcor Member
 Dr Arthur W. Rowe, Ph.D., Professor of Forensic Medicine, New York University Medical School
 Terry Katz, Alcor Member
 Aubrey de Grey, Ph.D., Biomedical Gerontologist
 Gregory Fahy, Ph.D. Vice President and Chief Scientific Officer, 21st Century Medicine
 Regina Pancake, Head of Alcor Stabilisation Team, South California
 Tilly Nydes
 Robin Nydes, Alcor Member
 Professor Ralph Merkle, Ph.D., Georgia Tech College of Computing
 Dr James R. Baker MD, Director Michigan Nanotechnology Institute

See also
 Gerontology
 Cryobiology
 Life extension

External links
 ZigZag Productions page about the program

British television documentaries
Cryonics